A Roman lead pipe inscription is a Latin inscription on a Roman water pipe made of lead which provides brief information on its manufacturer and owner, often the reigning emperor himself as the supreme authority. The identification marks were created by full text stamps.

Manufacture of pipes 

Lead, a by-product of the ancient silver smelting process, was produced in the Roman Empire with an estimated peak production of 80,000 metric tons per yeara truly industrial scale. The metal was used along with other materials in the vast water supply network of the Romans for the manufacture of water pipes, particularly for urban plumbing. 

The method of manufacturing the lead pipes is recorded by Vitruvius and Frontinus. The lead was poured into sheets of a uniform  length, which were bent to form a cylinder and soldered at the seam.

Creation of inscriptions 
Since the 19th century, the hypothesis has occasionally been put forward that the Roman inscriptions were created by movable type printing. A recent investigation by the typesetter and linguist Herbert Brekle, however, concludes that all material evidence points to the use of common text stamps. Brekle describes the manufacturing method as follows:

Brekle lists the following reasons for the employment of stamps and against that of movable type: for printing on lead sheets the way the Romans created them, it would be much more practical to use single stamp blocks than sets of individual letters, since the latter would be unstable and would have required a clamp or some similar mechanism to maintain the necessary cohesion. Neither impressions of such clamps nor of the fine lines between the individual letters typical for the use of movable type are discernible in the inscriptions. By contrast, the outer rim of one examined stamp block left a raised rectangular edge running around the inscription text, thus providing positive evidence for the use of such a printing device. 

In addition, evidence of the poor positioning of movable type, such as individual letters tilting to the right or left or deviating from the baseline – something which could have been expected to occur at least in a few extant specimens – is notably absent. In those inscriptions where the letters are not properly aligned, the entire text is blurred, which clearly points to the use of full text stamps. Finally, it needs to be considered that archaeological excavations have never unearthed ancient sets of movable type, whereas moulds with reversed inscription texts for stamp printing have indeed been recovered.

See also 
 Plumbing
 Roman aqueduct

References

Sources 
 
 
 
 
 Lanciani, R.: "Topografia di Roma antica. I commentarii di Frontino intorno le acque e gli acquedotti. Silloge epigrafica aquaria", in: Memorie della Reale Accademia dei Lincei, Serie III, Volume IV, Classe di Scienze Morali, Rom 1881 (Reprint: Quasar publishing house, 1975), pp. 215–616

External links 

Lead pipe
Plumbing
Inscriptions
History of printing